Akosua Gyamama Busia (born 30 December 1966) is a Ghanaian actress, film director, author and songwriter who lives in the United Kingdom. She played Nettie Harris in the 1985 film The Color Purple alongside Whoopi Goldberg.

Family and early life
Busia is the daughter of Kofi Abrefa Busia, who was prime minister of the Republic of Ghana (from 1969 to 1972) and a prince of the royal family of Wenchi, a subgroup of the Ashanti, making Akosua a princess too. Her sister, Abena Busia, is a poet and academic, who was a professor in English at Rutgers University, and since 2017 has been the Ghanaian ambassador to Brazil.

Busia grew up in Ghana, and began her acting career at the age of 16, attending London's Central School of Speech and Drama on scholarship. Her first acting role was as Juliet in an otherwise white cast performing Shakespeare's Romeo and Juliet at Oxford University, where her siblings were studying.

Career
Busia's film roles include a notable performance as Bessie in a 1986 film adaptation of Richard Wright's novel Native Son (with Geraldine Page and Matt Dillon. She also starred in Hard Lessons alongside Denzel Washington and Lynn Whitfield in 1986. Busia played Nettie (opposite Danny Glover and Whoopi Goldberg) in Steven Spielberg's 1985 The Color Purple, adapted from Alice Walker's novel of the same title, as Ruth in Badge of the Assassin (1985), as Jewel in John Singleton's Rosewood (1997), and as Patience in Antoine Fuqua's Tears of the Sun (2003). She has also appeared on television in the series ER.

Busia is the author of The Seasons of Beento Blackbird: A Novel (Washington Square Press, 1997). She was one of three co-writers for the screenplay adaptation of Toni Morrison's 1987 novel Beloved for the 1998 film version of the same name directed by Jonathan Demme. In 2008 Busia directed a film about her father: The Prof. A Man Remembered. Life, Vision & Legacy of K.A. Busia.
Busia also co-wrote the song "Moon Blue" with Stevie Wonder for his album A Time 2 Love, released in 2005. Her poem "Mama" is included in the 2019 anthology New Daughters of Africa, edited by Margaret Busby.

After 18-year hiatus to raise her daughter, in 2016 Busia returned to acting in the off-Broadway and Broadway production of Danai Gurira's play Eclipsed, alongside Lupita Nyong'o. For her performance off-Broadway, she received an Obie Award for Distinguished Performance as Rita

Personal life
On 12 October 1996, Akosua Busia married the American film director John Singleton, with whom she has a daughter — Hadar Busia-Singleton (born 3 April 1997); the couple divorced on 15 June 1997. Their daughter attended school in Ghana, before returning to the US.

She co-founded with her sister Abena Busia the Busia Foundation International, aiming "to provide assistance to the disadvantaged".

Filmography

References

External links 
 
 "Ama K. interviews Akosua Busia", YouTube video.

Ghanaian film actresses
Alumni of the University of Oxford
1966 births
Living people
Ghanaian novelists
Ghanaian women novelists
20th-century novelists
Ghanaian film directors
Ghanaian songwriters
Ghanaian screenwriters
20th-century Ghanaian women writers
20th-century Ghanaian writers
21st-century Ghanaian women writers
21st-century Ghanaian writers
Ghanaian women film directors
Ghanaian women poets
Ghanaian women screenwriters